Carmelite Monastery of Buda (natively: Karmelita kolostor) is a former Catholic monastic residence and the current seat of the Prime Minister of Hungary. 

The monastery was built in 1736 by the Carmelite order on the former site of a mosque that was destroyed in 1686 during the siege that liberated Buda from Ottoman occupation. The order received the real estate in 1693 and completed the new monastery and church by 1736, but it was consecrated only in 1763. 

Two decades later, Emperor Joseph II disbanded the order and converted the property into a theater by imperial order in 1786, "for the delectation of high-ranking court officials". Some notable performances included Beethoven and the premiere of Bánk Bán.

History

In the Middle Ages, the area was occupied by a Franciscan church devoted to St. John, built between 1269 and 1270. The building was converted to a mosque during the Turkish occupation, and was destroyed in the 1686 siege of Buda. The plot was given to the Carmelites in 1693. Laying the foundation stone in 1725, their church was built by 1736, but only consecrated in 1763.

Joseph II dissolved the order in 1784, and on his trip to Buda in 1786, he personally arranged to convert the church to a theatre, to entertain government officers of Buda. The plans were made by Wolfgang von Kempelen. A part of the crypt under the sanctuary was rebuilt as a trap room, and cells functioned as changing rooms. The high altar became the stage. With a three-story auditorium, and a capacity of 1200 seats, the premiere was held on 17 October 1787, from which on the theatre was home to mainly German productions for the next few decades. The first ever play in the Hungarian language was premiered on its stage, on 25 October 1790, by the company of László Kelemen. On 7 May 1800 Beethoven gave a concert here. The building was renovated in 1815.

According to a pact with the municipality of Buda, for a symbolic lease, a company like  from Kassa played in the theatre between 1833 and 1837, including acclaimed actors of the era, like Déryné, Márton Lendvay or Gábor Egressy. They formed the foundations of the later National Theatre opening in 1837. Until 1870, German troupes were playing in the building, when German plays were banned by the municipality. From 1871, the theatre was home to the National Theater, and from 1885 to 1886, also hosted plays of the Népszínház the Opera House, and the Academy of Drama.

After World War I, the theatre re-opened on 21 March 1918. Plans were made to make the theatre a chamber theatre of the National Theatre, but it was found unfit for the task. Smaller groups played in the building until 1924, when, after the gallery collapsed, it was closed for the next five decades. During World War II, it received severe bomb hits, collapsing the balcony. Until the end of the war, the building functioned as an army storage. Renovations took place in 1947.

The Várszínház was reopened on 13 February 1978, and was the home to the Népszínház until 1982, after which it was the chamber theatre of the National Theatre until 1 December 2001. From 2001, it is the home of the National Dance Theatre, thus being a theatre only in its name.

Since 2019 seat of the offices of the Prime Minister of Hungary.

Sources
- National Theatre in the Hungarian Theatrical Lexicon (György, Székely. Magyar Színházmuvészeti Lexikon. Budapest: Akadémiai Kiadó, 1994 ), freely available on mek.oszk.hu
Aurél, Molnár. A Várszínház. Pécs : Szikra Nyomda, 1978. OCLC:  21774521

External links
 National Dance Theatre - Official website of the National Dance Theatre

Buildings and structures in Budapest
Culture in Budapest
Theatres in Budapest
Official residences in Europe